Method Man,  The Fearless Young Boxer and "Avenging Boxer" is a 1979 martial arts film directed by Jimmy Shaw starring Casanova Wong.

Plot
Wu Pa Feng (Casanova Wong) kills one of his former gang members (Fei Lung) in a duel. Before the duel Fei Lung gives his son Shao Lung (Peter Chen) a golden plate that the gang is looking for. Shao Lung joins his uncles' travelling kung fu show to improve his fighting skills and escape the gang of killers.

Cast
 Peter Chen Lau as Shao Lung
 Chen Wai Lau as Uncle
 Fei Lung as Shao's father
 Casanova Wong as Wu Pa Fong

Trivia
Rapper Method Man adapted his name from this film.

References

External links
 
 

Kung fu films
1973 martial arts films
Hong Kong martial arts films
1973 films
1970s Hong Kong films